Kalos ilthe to dollario (Greek: , Welcome, dollar) is a 1967 Greek theatrical comedy film directed by Alekos Sakellarios.

The film stars Giorgos Konstantinou, Anna Kalouta and Sotiris Moustakas.

Plot

The shy and decent English tutor Filippos Angeloutsos needs to supplement his meager paychecks because of price hikes in the 6th American Fleet in the Port of Piraeus. He shared his proposal with madame Foulis, who is an English teacher to the girls at the Blue Black Bar in Troubas.  Filippos esteemed his employees with a large fabbor that he spent.  When the fleet arrived, Stavros confronted his problems in the attraction of sailors in a store and addressed again to Filippo with help.

Festival
The film was shown at the 1967 Thessaloniki Film Festival.

About the movie
Based on a theatrical work The 6th American Fleet by Alekos Sakellarios and Christos Giannakiopoulos
It was the first Greek movie filmed in colour that the technical work that happened everywhere in Greece.
The total cost of the movie was 5,000,000 drachmas.
It made 164,239 tickets (39th/99th)

Cast
Giorgos Konstantinou - Filippos Angeloutsos
Anna Kalouta - Madame Fouli
Sasa Kastoura - Gina
Niki Linardou - Liza
Sotiris Moustakas - Henri
Nikos Fermas - Stavros
Orfeas Zachos - Kimon Angeloutsos
Joly Garbi - Mrs. Angeloutsou
Alekos Tzanetakos - Takis Angeloutsos
Christos Doxaras - Giannis
Makis Demiris - Thanasis
Kostas Mentis - Grigoris
Kostas Papahristos - Agisilaos Merminopoulos
Stella Stratigou - Liana
Athinodoros Prousallis - Stamatis Tsimbas
Kostas Kafassis - Dimitris
Alekos Sakellarios - Andreas

External links
 Kalos ilthe to dollario at cine.gr

1967 films
1967 comedy films
1960s Greek-language films
Greek comedy films